Sigutė Stonytė (born 1955) is a Lithuanian soprano and professor at the Lithuanian Academy of Music and Theatre.

Biography

Ms. Sigutė Stonytė graduated from the Lithuanian Academy of Music in 1982 - here she studied singing with Prof. Z. Paulauskas. In 1982-1984 she also studied with vocal teacher Joana Kepenienė. In 1984 the soloist won the International Competition for Singers in Riga and a year later made her debut at the Lithuanian National Opera and Ballet Theatre as Tatyana in P. Tchaikovsky‘s opera “Eugene Onegin” - since then she has been performing leading soprano parts in most performances produced by the LNOBT and other companies. In 1991 Sigutė Stonytė won the second prize at the International Marian Anderson Vocal Arts Competition in Maryland, USA (first prize was not awarded).
 
Ms. Sigutė Stonytė is one of the most acclaimed Lithuanian opera singers, also enjoying wide international recognition. Her latest role, Desdemona in G. Verdi‘s “Otello” (directed by Eimuntas Nekrošius), was unanimously hailed as one of the most impressive and important works of the theatre season. In 1996 she became a laureate of the Kristoforas Award for the role of Lady Macbeth in G.Verdi's opera “Macbeth”, in 1999 - a laureate of the “Kipras” Prize of the Society of Lithuanian Opera Friends. In 2000 she was awarded the Knight’s Cross of the Order of the Lithuanian Grand Duke Gediminas. In 2003 she received a Special Prize given by the Ministry of Culture of the Republic of Lithuania for her interpretations of Amelia in G. Verdi‘s “Un ballo in maschera” and Zerlina in W. A. Mozart’s “Don Giovanni”. One year later she has been honoured with the Lithuanian National Prize - the most important award given to Lithuanian artists for their achievements. In 2005 the soloist was also given the “Operos Švyturiai“ Award as the Best Female Soloist of the Year. In 2011 she was awarded the “Golden Cross of the Stage” Award  for her portrayal of Countess Rosina Almaviva in W. A. Mozart's “Le nozze di Figaro”.

The soloist has an extensive concert repertoire - she’s often singing soprano parts in oratorios and masses (around 30 soprano parts ranging from Bach to Britten) and is an acclaimed performer of chamber pieces (including R. Schumann’s “Frauenliebe und Leben”, G. Mahler’s “Rueckert-Lieder”, O. Messiaen’s “Poemes pour Mi”, works by S. Rachmaninoff, R. Strauss, J. Karnavičius and many other authors). 
 
Sigutė Stonytė participated in various music festivals, such as Savonlinna Opera Festival (Abigaile), “Verdianaeum” in La Roncole (Abigaile), Bratislava Cantans, Heilbronn Festival in Germany (Agathe), Glamorgan Valley, Norrtelje Chamber Music festival, Holland Opera Festival (Aida), among others. She regularly sang Abigaile, Aida and Lady Macbeth at the Estonia Theatre in Tallinn, also performed the role Violetta together with the Lithuanian Opera Company of Chicago, sang Aida in Taiwan, Abigaile and Zerlina in England, and Salome in Tel Aviv. Together with the Latvian National Opera she toured France, where she performed Abigaile in the Opera Festival in Arles. 
 
The soloist has sung with the National Symphony Orchestra of the USA in the J. F. Kennedy Center in Washington D.C., with the Moscow Philharmonic, Odense Symphony, the Lithuanian State and National Symphony orchestras, the Estonian and Latvian Symphony orchestras, with the Lithuanian Chamber Orchestra, etc.
 
Sigutė Stonytė performed in Great Britain, Germany, France, Italy, Spain, The Netherlands, Denmark, Sweden, Finland, Estonia, Latvia, Russia, Poland, Czech Republic, the USA, Taiwan ROC, Japan and elsewhere.

In 1992 she started teaching at the Lithuanian Academy of Music and Theatre and is currently a Professor and one of Lithuania‘s most acclaimed teachers of vocal performance, often giving master classes abroad. She is also a judge in many local and international singing competitions.

Stonytė is married to a Lithuanian pianist Jurgis Karnavičius.

Opera roles
Tatyana in Eugene Onegin by Pyotr Tchaikovsky 
Violetta in La traviata by Giuseppe Verdi  
Lady Macbeth in Macbeth by Giuseppe Verdi 
Abigaile in Nabucco by Giuseppe Verdi 
Leonora in Il trovatore by Giuseppe Verdi 
Aida in Aida by Giuseppe Verdi 
Ramunė in Gražina by Jurgis Karnavičius 
Marguerite in Faust by Charles Gounod 
Cherubino in Le nozze di Figaro by Wolfgang Amadeus Mozart 
Fanny in La cambiale di matrimonio by Gioachino Rossini 
Elisabeth  in Tannhäuser by Richard Wagner 
Marcellina in Fidelio by Ludwig van Beethoven 
Agathe in Der Freischütz by Carl Maria von Weber  
Tosca in Tosca by Giacomo Puccini 
Antonia in The Tales of Hoffmann by Jacques Offenbach 
Sister Angelica in Suor Angelica by Giacomo Puccini 
Liza in The Queen of Spades by Pyotr Tchaikovsky
Senta The Flying Dutchman by Richard Wagner
Amelia in Un ballo in maschera by Giuseppe Verdi
Liu in Turandot by Giacomo Puccini
Leonora in La forza del destino by Giuseppe Verdi
Salome in Salome by Richard Strauss
Countess Almaviva in Le nozze di Figaro by Wolfgang Amadeus Mozart
Larina in Eugene Onegin by Pyotr Tchaikovsky  
Desdemona in Otello by Giuseppe Verdi
Elvira in Ernani by Giuseppe Verdi

Prizes and awards
1984: won the International Competition for Singers in Riga
1991: won second prize at the International Marian Anderson Vocal Arts Competition in Maryland (the first prize was not awarded)
1996: won Christopher Prize of the Lithuanian Theatre Union for the role of Lady Macbeth
1999: won Kipras Prize of the Society of Lithuanian Opera Friends for the Singer of the Year
2000: awarded Knight's Cross of the Order of the Lithuanian Grand Duke Gediminas 
2003: awarded special prize by the Lithuanian Ministry of Culture for roles of Amelia in Un ballo in maschera and Zerlina in Don Giovanni
2004: awarded 4th class Order of the Cross of Terra Mariana
2004: won the Lithuanian National Prize 
2005: won Opera Beacon Award of the Lithuanian National Opera and Ballet Theatre for the Best Female Soloist of the Year for her roles of Leonora in La forza del destino and Senta in The Flying Dutchman
2011: won Golden Cross of the Stage Award of the Lithuanian Theatre Union for the role of Countess Rosina Almaviva in The Marriage of Figaro
2011: won Opera Beacon Award of the Lithuanian National Opera and Ballet Theatre for the Best Female Soloist of the Year for her role of Desdemona in Otello directed by Eimuntas Nekrošius
2016: was bestowed the honorary Golden Cross of the Stage Award of the Lithuanian Theatre Union for Lifetime Achievements to Lithuanian theatre.

References

1955 births
Living people
Lithuanian sopranos
Lithuanian Academy of Music and Theatre alumni
Academic staff of the Lithuanian Academy of Music and Theatre
Knight's Crosses of the Order of the Lithuanian Grand Duke Gediminas
Place of birth missing (living people)
Musicians from Vilnius